Amalda fuscolingua is a species of sea snail, a marine gastropod mollusc in the family Ancillariidae, the olives.

Description

Distribution

References

External links
 [https://science.mnhn.fr/institution/mnhn/collection/im/item/2000-1439 Holotype at MNHN, Paris)

fuscolingua
Gastropods described in 1988